The Americas Zone was one of three Zones of Davis Cup competition in 2006.

Group I

Group II

Bolivia and Guatemala relegated to Group III in 2007.
Colombia promoted to Group I in 2007.

Group III
Venue: Maya Country Club, Santa Tecla, El Salvador (clay)
Date: 14–18 June

(scores in italics carried over from Groups)

El Salvador and Cuba promoted to Group II in 2007.
Honduras and Trinidad and Tobago relegated to Group IV in 2007.

Group IV
Venue: Maya Country Club, Santa Tecla, El Salvador (clay)
Date: 14–18 June

Barbados and Panama promoted to Group III in 2007.

See also

 
Americas
Davis Cup Americas Zone